The Kingdom of Iceland was a sovereign and independent country under a constitutional and hereditary monarchy that was established by the Act of Union with Denmark signed on 1 December 1918. It lasted until 17 June 1944 when a national referendum established the Republic of Iceland in its place.

Under a personal union, due to the Act of Union, the monarch was simultaneously monarch of Denmark. The Parliament of Iceland asked that Denmark represent Iceland internationally, and day-to-day matters were delegated to a Danish plenipotentiary for Icelandic affairs based in Reykjavík, and – after the German invasion of Denmark in 1940 – a regent was appointed.

History

Origins of Danish rule

Because of the Kalmar Union, Iceland had been under the control of the Crown of Denmark since 1380, although formally it had been a Norwegian possession until 1814. In 1874, one thousand years after the first acknowledged settlement, Denmark granted Iceland home rule. The constitution, written the same year, was revised in 1903 and the extent of Iceland's home rule increased in 1904.

Establishment of the kingdom

On 1 December 1918, the Act of Union, an agreement with Denmark, recognized Iceland as a fully sovereign state, an independent country in personal union with Denmark through a common monarch. The Kingdom of Iceland established its own flag and coat of arms and asked that Denmark represent its foreign affairs and defence interests on its behalf while retaining full control over its foreign affairs and defence. Iceland opened its first Embassy in 1920. The Act would be reviewed in 1940 and could be revoked three years later if agreement to continue it could not be reached.

The Second World War, British occupation and the establishment of the republic

During the first year of the Second World War, Iceland strictly enforced a position of neutrality and took action against both British and German forces that violated it. The German invasion of Denmark on 9 April 1940 and subsequent occupation severed communications between Iceland and Denmark. As a result, on 10 April, the Althing passed two resolutions investing the Icelandic cabinet with the power of head of state and declaring that the Kingdom of Iceland would accept full responsibility for both foreign policy and coastal surveillance. On 10 May 1940, Operation Fork was launched by the United Kingdom when military forces sailed into Reykjavík Harbour and began an invasion of Iceland. The Government of Iceland issued a protest against what it called a "flagrant violation" of Icelandic neutrality. On the day of the invasion, Prime Minister Hermann Jónasson read a radio announcement instructing Icelanders to treat the British troops as guests. 
On 15 May 1941, the Althing adopted a law creating the position of regent for Sveinn Björnsson in order to represent the monarchy.

At its peak, Britain had approximately 25,000 troops stationed in Iceland, all but eliminating unemployment in Reykjavík and other strategically important places. In July 1941, the Althingi adopted the American–Icelandic defence agreement, passing responsibility for Iceland's defence to the United States.

Following a constitutional referendum in May 1944, Iceland formally became a republic on 17 June 1944. King Christian X sent a message of congratulations to the Icelandic people.

Titles of the Crown

By the Grace of God, King of Iceland, Denmark, the Wends and the Goths, Duke of Schleswig, Holstein, Stormarn, Dithmarschen, Lauenburg and Oldenburg.

Flags

See also

 Nobility in Iceland
 Icelandic independence movement
 Danish Realm
 Constitution of Denmark
 Greenlandic independence
 Faroese independence
 List of rulers of Iceland
 Jørgen Jørgensen, a.k.a. the "Dog-Days King", self-styled ruler of Iceland for a brief period in 1809

References

Bibliography
 "Iceland, Home Rule and Sovereignty (1904–44)" at Encyclopædia Britannica. Retrieved on 17 March 2014.

Former kingdoms
Kingdom of Iceland
States and territories established in 1918
States and territories disestablished in 1944
Island countries
1918 establishments in Iceland
1944 disestablishments in Iceland
20th century in Iceland